Rampur Baghelan is a town and a nagar panchayat in Satna district in the Indian state of Madhya Pradesh.

Demographics
 India census, Rampur Baghelan had a population of 11,315. Males constitute 52% of the population and females 48%. Rampur Baghelan has an average literacy rate of 61%, higher than the national average of 59.5%: male literacy is 70%, and female literacy is 51%. In Rampur Baghelan, 18% of the population is under 6 years of age.

References

Cities and towns in Satna district
Satna